Ray Hogan born 21 November 1981 in Limerick, Ireland is a former rugby union player for Bristol in the Guinness Premiership. After several seasons with Irish province Connacht Hogan signed for Bristol in the summer of 2007.

Hogan played as a prop. He has represented Ireland at Ireland A level on several occasions, participating in the Churchill Cup tournament. He was forced to retire from rugby with a recurrent knee problem in 2009.

References

 Hogan in Ireland A squad for Churchill Cup

External links
Bristol Rugby profile
Connacht profile

1981 births
Living people
Bristol Bears players
Galwegians RFC players
Irish rugby union players
Connacht Rugby players
Sportspeople from Limerick (city)
Rugby union props